(RTCI) is a national radio station in Tunisia, headquartered in the capital city, Tunis. Launched on 15 October 1938, it now broadcasts on 92.0 and 98.2 FM in Tunis. With its nationalization in February 1960, the station was renamed Chaîne internationale de Radio Tunis (International Channel of Radio Tunis) and in 1986, Radio Tunis Chaîne Internationale or more simply RTCI.

Since July 18, 2015, RTCI has been broadcasting its programs 24 hours a day in medium wave (963 kHz). 
The station is also available on satellite and online, broadcasts mainly in French, but also in English, Spanish, Italian and German.

References

External links

 National Broadcasting Office 
 DAB+ National ensemble

Radio stations in Tunisia
Radio stations established in 1938